Ruth Hesse (born 18 September 1936) is a German dramatic mezzo-soprano. She was a member of the Deutsche Oper Berlin from 1962 to 1995, and appeared internationally, including the Bayreuth Festival and the Salzburg Festival. She appeared regularly at the Vienna State Opera from 1965 to 1988, and was appointed an Austrian Kammersängerin in 1982. In Berlin, she took part in the world premiere of Henze's Der junge Lord.

Life and career 
Born in Wuppertal, Hesse first studied with Peter Offermanns in Wuppertal, then with Hildegard Scharf in Hamburg and finally also in Milan. She made her debut in 1958 at the Theater Lübeck as Orpheus in Gluck's Orfeo ed Euridice, and remained there until 1960. Afterwards she was engaged for two seasons at the Staatsoper Hannover. In 1960 she made her debut at the Hamburg State Opera and the Bayreuth Festival, where she performed until 1979 and was gradually assigned larger roles, culminating in Ortrud in Lohengrin, opposite Peter Hofmann and Karan Armstrong.

From 1962 to 1995, she was engaged by the Deutsche Oper Berlin, singing a wide repertoire. She took part in the world premiere of Henze's Der junge Lord on 7 April 1965, singing the role of Frau von Hufnagel.

From the second half of the 1960s she made first appearances at major opera houses in Europe in new roles. In 1965, she sang at the Vienna State Opera both Ortrud and Eboli in Verdi's Don Carlos. A year later, she appeared as Brangäne in Wagner's Tristan und Isolde at the Lyon Opera. In 1968 she was invited by the Holland Festival to sing Herodias in Salome by Richard Strauss. Hesse made her Royal Opera House debut in 1969 as the Nurse in Richard Strauss's Die Frau ohne Schatten, a lengthy and vocally demanding role depicting a  morally ambiguous character. When she reprised the role there in 1975, the critic for The Musical Times described her performance as "tirelessly ingenious and vocally in splendid command". In 1972, she sang at the Paris Opéra Garnier in Mozart's Le nozze di Figaro, and again as the Nurse. In 1974 and 1975 she was the Nurse in an acclaimed production at the Salzburg Festival, conducted by Karl Böhm and directed by Günther Rennert, alongside James King and Leonie Rysanek as the imperial couple and Walter Berry and Birgit Nilsson as the Dyer and his wife, in a production that was recorded.

Hesse also gave guest performances at the Grand Théâtre de Bordeaux, Opéra National de Lyon, Opéra de Marseille, Théâtre du Capitole in Toulouse, Chorégies d'Orange and Grand Théâtre de Genève, Théâtre Royal de la Monnaie in Brussels, De Nationale Opera in Amsterdam, Gran Teatre del Liceu in Barcelona, Royal Swedish Opera in Stockholm and the Bolshoi Theatre in Moscow. She also performed in several Italian opera houses, including the Teatro dell'Opera di Roma, Teatro Regio di Torino and La Fenice in Venice. Invitations to North America took her to the San Francisco Opera, Lyric Opera of Chicago and Washington National Opera and to Mexico City. In South America she performed at the Teatro Colón of Buenos Aires and the Rio de Janeiro Opera. A tour by the Deutsche Oper Berlin also brought her to Japan.

She was a regular guest at the Vienna State Opera from 1965 to 1988, where she appeared as Herodias, the Nurse, Ortrud, Brangäne, Magdalene, Fricka and Waltraute, Eboli, as well as Amneris in Verdi's Aida, Azucena in his Il trovatore, Maddalena in his Rigoletto and Preziosilla in his La forza del destino, Giulietta in Offenbach's Les contes d'Hoffmann and Burija in Janáček's Jenůfa. In 1982 she was appointed a Kammersängerin. On 29 November 1988, she retired from the house as Herodias.

She also performed in concert, including a performance of Salome at Carnegie Hall in New York in 1975.  In 1970, Hesse portrayed Gertrud in a film of Hänsel und Gretel.

Hesse has been married to the director  since 1976. The couple met in 1975 at the Salzburg Festival, where she was singing in Die Frau ohne Schatten and he was serving as an assistant to the production's set designer, Günther Schneider-Siemssen.

On DVD are found Hesse's performances of Tristan und Isolde (with Nilsson and Jon Vickers, 1973) and Der fliegende Holländer (opposite Sir Donald McIntyre, 1975).

Roles

World premieres 
 1963 Milhaud: Oresteia (24 April) – Deutsche Oper Berlin (world premiere of the 3rd part Les Eumenides) 
 1965 Hufnagel's wife in Henze's Der junge Lord (7 April) – Deutsche Oper Berlin

Repertoire

Recordings

Operas 
 Henze: Der junge Lord, with Edith Mathis (Luise); Donald Grobe (Wilhelm), Barry McDaniel (secretary of Sir Edgar), Loren Driscoll (Lord Barrat), Ruth Hesse (Hufnagel's wife) and Vera Little (Begonia); Orchestra and Choir of the Deutsche Oper Berlin and the Schöneberger Sängerknaben, conductor: Christoph von Dohnányi (in the world premiere production directed by Gustav Rudolf Sellner), DG 449 875-2 (double CDs) / Medici Arts 2072398 (DVD) 1967
 Smetana: Die verkaufte Braut, excerpts with Barry McDaniel, Cvetka Ahlin, Melitta Muszely, Martti Talvela, Ruth Hesse, Rudolf Schock, Kurt Böhme; Choir and Orchestra of the Deutsche Oper Berlin, conductor: Heinrich Hollreiser, LP, Album, Electrola
 Strauss: Die Frau ohne Schatten, with James King (Emperor), Leonie Rysanek (Empress), Walter Berry (Dyer), Birgit Nilsson (Dyer's Wife), Ruth Hesse (Nurse), Orchestra of the Wiener Staatsoper, Karl Böhm, DG 1977, live, shortened
 Wagner: Lohengrin, with Otto von Rohr, Herbert Schachtschneider (Lohengrin), Leonore Kirschstein (Elsa), Heinz Imdahl (Friedrich von Telramund), Ruth Hesse (Ortrud), Hans Helm, Konzertvereinigung Wiener Staatsopernchor, Large Symphony Orchestra (with members of the Czech Philharmonic), conductor: Hans Swarowsky, aufgenommen im August 1968, Augsburg: Weltbild Classics 1996.
 Wagner: Tristan und Isolde, with Ingrid Bjoner (Isolde), Hans Beirer (Tristan), Walter Kreppel (King Marke), Ruth Hesse (Brangäne), Otto Wiener etc.; Choir and Orchestra of the Wiener Staatsoper, Live-Mitschnitt, ca. 1970
 Wagner: Tristan und Isolde, with Birgit Nilsson (Isolde), Jon Vickers (Tristan), Hans Sotin (Marke), Ruth Hesse (Brangäne), Hans Günter Nöcker, Anton Dermota among others; Choir and Orchestra of the Wiener Staatsoper, live 5 December 1976
 Wagner: Die Meistersinger von Nürnberg, with Horst Lunow, Theo Adam (Hans Sachs), Eberhard Büchner, Ruth Hesse (Magdalene), Zoltán Kelemen, Geraint Evans, Peter Schreier (David), Karl Ridderbusch, René Kollo (Walther von Stolzing), Helen Donath (Eva); Staatskapelle Dresden, conductor: Herbert von Karajan, EMI Classics

Choral works 
 Bach: Christmas Oratorio, with Heather Harper, Thomas Page, Kieth Engen, Wiener Symphoniker, conductor Hans Swarowsky
 Mozart: Requiem, with Heather Harper, Thomas Page, Kieth Engen; Orchestra of the Wiener Staatsoper, Wiener Kammerchor, conductor: Pierre Colombo. Festival Classique

Literature 
 Opera Nederland: Mezzosopraan Ruth Hesse wordt 80 jaar, retrieved 23 March 2019

References

External links 
 
 
 Aryeh Oron, Fiume Simonini: Ruth Hesse (Mezzo-soprano), on Bach Cantatas Website

1936 births
Living people
Musicians from Wuppertal
German operatic mezzo-sopranos
German contraltos
Österreichischer Kammersänger
20th-century German women  opera singers